= Chislehurston =

- Location within Gauteng Location within South Africa
- Coordinates: 26°6′59″S 28°3′7″E
- Country: South Africa
- Province: Gauteng
- Municipality: City of Johannesburg
- Main Place: Sandton
- Established: 1958

Area
  - Total: 0.74 km^{2} (0.29 sq mi)

Population (2011)
  - Total: 253
  - Density: 340/km^{2} (890/sq mi)

Racial makeup (2011)
  - Black African: 44.7%
  - Coloured: 0.8%
  - Indian/Asian: 1.2%
  - White: 53.4%

First languages (2011)
  - English: 54.2%
  - Zulu: 13.8%
  - Tswana: 5.9%
  - Southern Ndebele: 4.7%
  - Other: 21.3%
- Time zone: UTC+2 (SAST)
- Postal code (street): 2196

Chrislehurston is a suburb of Johannesburg, South Africa. It is located in Region E of the City of Johannesburg Metropolitan Municipality.

== History ==
The suburb is situated on part of an old Witwatersrand farm called Syferfontein. It was established in 1958 and was named after Chislehurst, Kent.
